Zella-Mehlis is a town in the Schmalkalden-Meiningen district, in Thuringia, Germany. It is situated in the Thuringian Forest, 5 km north of Suhl, and 20 km east of Meiningen. The town of Zella-Mehlis is the site of the original Walther Arms and J.G. Anschütz weapons factories. They remained there until the Soviets occupied eastern Germany at the end of World War II. The former municipality Benshausen was merged into Zella-Mehlis in January 2019.

Historical Population

Twin towns
Zella-Mehlis is twinned with:

  Andernach, Germany
  Gemünden am Main, Germany
  Saint-Martin-d'Hères, France

Personalities

Honorary citizen 
 Helmut Recknagel (* 1937), the first German Olympic ski jumping champion and world champion, started for SC Motor Zella-Mehlis

Sons and daughters of the city

 Johann Kaspar Friedrich Manso (1759-1826), teacher, historian and philologist
 Johann Heinrich Ehrhardt (1805-1883), locomotive builder, engineer of the Saxon Railroad
 Johann Peter Haseney (1812-1869), copper engraver, creator of the first German stamp "Schwarzer Einser" (Black one)
Karl Künstler (1901–1945), Nazi SS concentration camp commandant
 Michael Schumann (1946-2000), professor of philosophy, politician (SED, PDS), Member of Brandenburg Landtag, Member of Bundestag
 Anja Kampe (born 1968), Opera singer

People associated with Zella-Mehlis
 Carl Walther (1858-1915), gunsmith
 Marcel Callo (1921-1945), blessed of the Roman Catholic Church, a place was named here after him
 Horst Queck (born 1943), ski jumper 
 Reinhard Heß (1945-2007), ski jumping coach of the German national team
 Fredi Albrecht (born 1947), wrestler and competitor, visited the children's and youth sports school here
 Klaus-Peter Göpfert (born 1948), wrestler, attended the children's and sports school in Zella-Mehlis
 Rainer Schmidt (born 1948), ski jumper, overall winner of the Four Hills Tournament, lives in Zella-Mehlis
 Christoph Matschie (born 1961), politician, SPD Chairman of the State of Thuringia 1999–2014, minister and parliamentary secretary of state, received training as a mechanic in Zella-Mehlis
 Kati Wilhelm (born 1976), biathlete 
 Sebastian Haseney (born 1978), Nordic Combiner 
 Franz Göring (born 1984), cross-country skier, lives in Zella-Mehlis
 Andi Langenhan (born 1984), Rennrodler 
 Frank Rommel (born 1984), Skeleton Pilots
 Tino Edelmann (born 1985), Nordic Combiner

References

Schmalkalden-Meiningen
Saxe-Coburg and Gotha